Mountain pine (Pinus mugo) is a species of pine tree. Mountain pine can also refer to:

Botany
Mountain pine (Halocarpus bidwillii)
Table mountain pine (Pinus pungens)

Places
Mountain Pine, Arkansas, U.S.A.
The Mountain pine forest, Russia
Mountain Pine Ridge Forest Reserve, Belize

See also
Mountain pine beetle
Pine Mountain (disambiguation)